Passo de anjo is the debut album of the Brazilian big band SpokFrevo Orquestra. Released in 2004, the album was praised for its innovation of frevo, which presents some influences from jazz, emphasizing improvisations. The album was firstly released independently. However, two years later, due to its success, it was released again by Biscoito Fino.

The disc presents reinterpretations of old frevo classics, but also presents new compositions. Between many musicians which participated of its recording, one can cite Antonio Nóbrega, which plays violin in some songs.

Passo de anjo was elected by O Estado de S. Paulo as one of the three best albums released in 2004.

Track listing

Personnel
SpokFrevo Orquestra:

Spok: saxophone
Gilberto Pontes: saxophone
Gilmar Black: saxophone
Gustavo Anacleto: saxophone
Enok Chagas: trumpet
Fábio Costa: trumpet
José Francisco (Pêto): trumpet
Alexandre "Papa-Légua": trumpet
Jailson José: trumpet
Germeson Silva: trumpet
Nilsinho Amarante: trombone
Marcílio Batista: trombone
Cléber Silva: trombone
Flávio Souza: trombone
Jorge Guerra: trombone
Adelson Silva: percussion
Augusto Silva: percussion
Elisângelo de Oliveira: percussion
Renato Bandeira: guitar
Hélio Silva: bass

Special guests:

Adelson Viana: accordion and keyboards (in "Frevo da luz" and "Pontapé")
Ítalo Oliveira: keyboards (in "Frevo da luz" and "Pontapé")
Heriberto Cavalcanti: flute (in "Frevo da luz" and "Pontapé")
Carlinhos Ferreira: clarinet (in "Frevo da luz" and "Pontapé")
Cristiano Pessoa: guitar (in "Frevo da luz" and "Pontapé")
Miquéias Sousa: bass (in "Frevo da luz" and "Pontapé")
Adriano Giffone: bass (in "Frevo da luz" and "Pontapé")
Luizinho Duarte: drums (in "Frevo da luz" and "Pontapé")
Tarcísio de Lima: (in "Frevo da luz" and "Pontapé")
Antônio Hoto: percussion (in "Frevo da luz" and "Pontapé")
Antonio Nóbrega: violin (in "Lágrima de folião")
Zezinho Pitoco: clarinet (in "Lágrima de folião")
Edmilson Capeluppi: acoustic guitar (in "Lágrima de folião")
Gabriel Almeida: pandeiro (in "Lágrima de folião")
Luciano Oliveira: guitar (in "Ela me disse")
Marimbanda: arrangement (in "Frevo da luz")
Genaro: accordion (in "Frevo sanfonado")

References

2004 debut albums
Spok albums